Milan "Jezdo" Jezdimirović (born in Užice, 5 September 1996) is a Serbian football player who plays for Džiugas.

References

1996 births
Living people